The following is a list of plays that have won the Tony Award or Laurence Olivier Award for Best Play.  Highlighted shows are currently running on either Broadway or West End as of April 2022.

See also
 List of Tony Award- and Olivier Award-winning musicals

References

External links
  Tony Awards official website
  Olivier Awards official website

.
.
Lists of plays

List of Tony Award-winning plays
List of Olivier Award-winning plays